Oviya is a Tamil language drama airing on Colors Tamil. It premiered on 26 November 2018 and ended on 3 September 2020. The show stars Kushi Sampath Kumar, Surendar and Harshala. This series was the remake of a Hindi language television series Uttaran which aired on Colors TV.

Plot
Oviya follows two friends from different socio-economic backgrounds - Oviya, a maid-servant's daughter, and Gayathri, the child of a wealthy landlord. Oviya is kind, caring and helpful, while Gayathri is spoilt, selfish and jealous.

Cast

Main 
 Gomathi Priya (2018 − 2020) → Kushi Sampath Kumar (2020) as Oviya − Saravanan's Wife / Surya's ex-lover
 Kannan → Karthick Vasu as Saravanan Rajashekhar − Oviya's husband; Surya & Guna's elder brother (died in serial)
 Surendar Shanmugam as Surya − Oviya's former lover; Gayathri's husband
 Harshala Honey (2018 − 2019; 2020) → Punitha Balakrishnan (2019 − 2020) as Gayathri − Surya's wife

Recurring 
 Soodhu Kavvum Sivakumar as Rajashekhar − Saravanan's foster father; Surya & Guna's father
 Caroline as Amaravathi − Saravanan's foster mother; Surya & Guna's mother
 Premi Venkat as Thilagavathi − Gayathri's mother
 Sangeetha Balan as Gandhimathi − Amaravathi's elder sister; Saravanan's biological mother
 Vidhush Chowdhary as Vetri − Gayathri's ex-boyfriend
 Ashwin Kannan as Guna − Saravanan & Surya's younger brother
 Jeeva Ravi as Ravi Varma − Gayathri's father (died in serial)
 Thennavan as Munnusamy − Oviya's father (died in serial)
 Sindhu Shyam as Anbakarasi a.k.a. Anbu − Oviya's mother
 Arvind Kathare as Selvam − Gayathiri's maternal uncle; Thilagavathi's younger brother
 Jennifer Sudharshan as Parvathy − Gayathri's maternal grandmother
 Rekha Nair as Bhagya − Gayathri's maternal aunt; Selvam's wife
 Divya Banu as Arivazhagi a.k.a. Arivu − Oviya's friend
 Nivisha Kingkon as Madhavi − Gayathri's arch-rival
 VJ Vivek Prabhakaran as Vaseegaran − Vetri's friend; Gayathri's blackmailer

Adaptations

References

External links

Colors Tamil original programming
2010s Tamil-language television series
2018 Tamil-language television series debuts
Tamil-language television shows
2020 Tamil-language television series endings
Tamil-language television series based on Hindi-language television series